Campbell Foster (2 November 1914 – 17 December 1978) was a West Indian cricket umpire. He stood in one Test match, West Indies vs. England, in 1948. He also played in two first-class matches for the Barbados cricket team in 1936/37 and 1937/38.

See also
 List of Test cricket umpires

References

1914 births
1978 deaths
Barbadian cricketers
Barbados cricketers
Barbadian cricket umpires
West Indian Test cricket umpires